Carole Raphaelle Davis (born 17 February 1958) is an English actress, model, singer-songwriter, and writer.

Career

Acting
In 1978, Davis posed for Playboy. In 1980, she posed for Penthouse magazine under the name Tamara Kapitas, becoming Penthouse Pet of the Month in January 1980 and a runner-up for Pet of the Year in 1981.

As an actress, Davis' first feature film was in James Cameron's horror film Piranha II: The Spawning (1982). Later in the 1980s, she appeared in the comedy film The Flamingo Kid (1984). Her best known film role came as Roxie Shield, the vengeful ex-girlfriend in Mannequin (1987), a film that was widely panned by critics but later became a cult classic. She later also appeared in films such as the comedy The Shrimp on the Barbie (1990), the comedy If Looks Could Kill (1991), and The Rapture (1991).

She has made guest appearances on television series such as The A-Team, Star Trek: Voyager, Sex and the City, Angel and more recently in 2 Broke Girls, and Madam Secretary.

Music
In 1989, Davis' signed with Warner Bros. Records and released her first album Heart of Gold, which was produced by Nile Rodgers. Her single "Serious Money" (a cover of The O'Jays hit "For the Love of Money") was a dance hit and the video was number one and became the original theme song to the hip hop music video show Rap City on BET. The song's success enabled Davis to tour Europe and Asia and perform in clubs throughout the United States.

As a songwriter, Davis signed a publishing deal with MCA. In Europe, she signed on with Sony France. Davis met Prince in the 1980s and the two developed a friendship, culminating in Davis co-writing Prince's single "Slow Love" for his Grammy Award-nominated album Sign o' the Times. She recorded her own version of the song for Warner Bros. Records but subsequently left the label in 1993 and moved to Atlantic Records, where she self-produced and wrote the album I'm No Angel.

Writing
Davis has written a series of articles on anti-Semitism in Europe for The Jewish Journal. As a novelist, she is the author of The Diary of Jinky, Dog of a Hollywood Wife, a non-fiction humour book about Hollywood excess and human status anxiety written from the point of view of a death row dog. Her screenplay "Amnesia of the Heart" was set up at DreamWorks. She has been a contributor for several animal welfare publications including American Dog Magazine, for whom she also worked as an investigative journalist. She had an animal welfare column on Newsvine and ran her own blog Hollywood Dog through Blogspot.

She is the West Coast Director of the Companion Animal Protection Society, a national non-profit organisation that investigates puppy mills and pet stores.

Selected filmography

Film

Television

References

External links
 
 
 
 "The Diary of Jinky, Dog of a Hollywood Wife" published by Andrews McMeel

Living people
1958 births
English female models
English film actresses
English television actresses
English women pop singers
Actresses from London
Female models from New York (state)
American female models
American film actresses
American television actresses
American women pop singers
American women songwriters
British emigrants to the United States
20th-century American women singers
21st-century American women singers
21st-century American women writers
20th-century American singers
21st-century American singers
20th-century English women
20th-century English people
21st-century English women
21st-century English people
Penthouse Pets